The Ewing System is a balancing monorail system developed in the late 19th century by British inventor W. J. Ewing. It is not to be confused with the much later system patented by  Robert W.  Ewing.

In the Ewing System the main wheels of the train run on a single steel rail. The system had been proposed in 1868 by William Thorold, a civil engineer from Norwich, Norfolk.

The major benefit of trains is that they run on steel tracks. Steel rail can carry more load with less rolling friction than any other mode of ground transport. However there are several disadvantages of laying conventional railway tracks consisting of two rails: Both rails have to rise and fall and bank together. Laying two rails requires a lot of space and maintenance. The turning radius of the train is restricted by the difference in length or distance traveled between the inside and outside rails due to curve resistance. Curve resistance means that the wheels on the inside rail travel a shorter distance than the wheels on the outside rail to get the vehicle around a curve. The trains can only turn to the limit where its outer wheels can cope with the additional required speed. If the outer wheels fail to maintain or reach the required speed, the train may derail.

W.J. Ewing implemented a monorail system, with only one rail and double flanged rail wheels, that had been proposed by William Thorold in a lecture to the British Association in 1868. This system avoided all those problems, since it was laid out along the side of a road, it took up very little land. Further, the road or balance wheel's main purpose was to balance the train and to keep it upright. The balancing wheel on the road carried only 4% or 5% of the load, it did not subtract much from the steel wheel-steel rail efficiency. As the track was on side of the road, it was no obstacle to vehicles crossing it. Further, since it was a monorail with a supporting wheel on the ground, the issue of curve resistance did not arise in Ewing System, since the wheels were placed on a single track only.

The Ewing system was used in Patiala State Monorail Trainways. The Patiala monorail is preserved in National Rail Museum at New Delhi. It is still in running condition. It was also used on Kundala Valley Railway from 1902 to 1908.

References 

Monorails